Ujčov is a municipality and village in Žďár nad Sázavou District in the Vysočina Region of the Czech Republic. It has about 500 inhabitants.

Administrative parts
Villages of Dolní Čepí, Horní Čepí, Kovářová and Lískovec are administrative parts of Ujčov.

References

Villages in Žďár nad Sázavou District